The Racer-class sloop also known as the Cordelia class of swift cruisers was an 11-gun wooden screw sloop class of five ships built for the Royal Navy between 1855 and 1860.

Design

The class were armed with a single 32-pounder gun (58 cwt) gun on a pivot mount and ten 32-pounder (25 cwt) carronades on the broadside.  These guns were all smoothbore muzzle-loading, and were little changed from the standard guns of Nelson's era.

Propulsion was provided by a two-cylinder horizontal single-expansion steam engine developing  and driving a single screw. A barque rig of sails was carried, which meant the ships of the class had three masts with a square rig on the fore and main masts.

Ships
The first three ships were ordered on 3 April 1854, although both Cordelia and Gannet were ordered as Swallow-class sloops, with the design being changed before construction. Icarus was ordered on 3 February 1855 and Pantaloon was ordered on 1 April 1857.

Citations

References
Bastock, John (1988), Ships on the Australia Station, Child & Associates Publishing Pty Ltd; Frenchs Forest, Australia. 

Ship classes of the Royal Navy
Sloop classes
Sloops of the Royal Navy
 Racer